Oakhaven is a town in Hempstead County, Arkansas, United States. The population was 63 at the 2010 census. It is part of the Hope Micropolitan Statistical Area.

Geography
Oakhaven is located at  (33.729477, -93.619571).

Demographics

As of the census of 2000, there were 54 people, 20 households, and 17 families residing in the city. The racial makeup of the city was 90.74% White, 1.85% from other races, and 7.41% from two or more races. 1.85% of the population were Hispanic or Latino of any race.

There were 20 households, out of which 45.0% had children under the age of 18 living with them, 60.0% were married couples living together, 20.0% had a female householder with no husband present, and 15.0% were non-families. 15.0% of all households were made up of individuals, and 15.0% had someone living alone who was 65 years of age or older. The average household size was 2.70 and the average family size was 3.00.

In the city the population was spread out, with 35.2% under the age of 18, 7.4% from 18 to 24, 18.5% from 25 to 44, 20.4% from 45 to 64, and 18.5% who were 65 years of age or older. The median age was 35 years. For every 100 females, there were 86.2 males. For every 100 females age 18 and over, there were 94.4 males.

The median income for a household in the city was $63,750, and the median income for a family was $63,750. Males had a median income of $63,125 versus $25,625 for females. The per capita income for the city was $22,535. None of the population and none of the families were below the poverty line.

Education
It is within the Hope School District. It operates Hope High School.

References

Towns in Arkansas
Towns in Hempstead County, Arkansas
Hope micropolitan area